Chowder may refer to:

Chowder, any of a variety of soups
Clam chowder, a chowder containing clams and broth
Corn chowder, a chowder with corn, bacon and broth
Southern Illinois chowder, a thick stew/soup
Chowder (TV series), an animated television series created by C.H. Greenblatt
 California Clam Chowder, a 1992 album by Thelonious Monster